Stomatolina angulata is a species of sea snail, a marine gastropod mollusk in the family Trochidae, the top snails.

Description
The length of the shell varies between 5 mm and 16 mm. The depressed shell is thin but rather solid, with very short, conical spire. It is greenish gray, obscurely longitudinally striped with dull, pale reddish brown. The surface is lusterless, with numerous unequal spiral threads, latticed by wavy riblets of growth. The three whorls are encircled by two strong carinae above, and numerous smaller lirae below the periphery and with strong, short subsutural folds. The body whorl is large, depressed, and impressed at the place of umbilicus. The oblique aperture is subrotund.

Distribution
The marine species occurs off the Philippines and Japan.

References

 Higo, S., Callomon, P. & Goto, Y. (1999). Catalogue and bibliography of the marine shell-bearing Mollusca of Japan. Osaka. : Elle Scientific Publications. 749 pp

External links
 To Encyclopedia of Life
 To GenBank (4 nucleotides; 1 proteins)
 To World Register of Marine Species
 

angulata
Gastropods described in 1850